A Turma do Balão Mágico is the sixth studio album by Brazilian band Turma do Balão Mágico, released on October 30, 1986, by Som Livre. The album sold 600,000 copies. In 1988 A Nova Turma do Balão Mágico was formed.

Track listing

Side A
 Roda Roda Pião
 Boa Vida (Tema Do Gato Garfield)
 Menina (Com Leo Jaime)
 Pa-ra-tchi-bum
 Putz, O Grande Mágico
 Flechas Do Amor

Side B
 O Que Cantam As Crianças (Com José Luis Perales) (Esta música,  no disco do cantor espanhol lançado em Julho de 1986, conta com as vozes-solos de todos os integrantes, mas no disco do grupo, as vozes de Mike e Ricardinho foram apagadas)
 Felicidade (Com Simone)
 Salsita
 Você É Música
 Bate Palma (Homenagem ao grupo Os Trapalhões)
 Papabaquigrifismo
 Travesseiro

References 

1986 albums
Portuguese-language albums
Som Livre albums